Junie B. Jones is a children's book series written by Barbara Park and illustrated by Denise Brunkus. Published by Random House from 1992 to 2013, the story centers on "almost six-year-old" Junie B. Jones and her adventures in kindergarten and first grade.

Books

Since the original book was published by Random House in 1992, a total of 31 Junie B. Jones books have been published. 28 are stories that take place in the Junie B. Jones series, and three are activity books entitled Junie B.'s Essential Survival Guide, Top-Secret Personal Beeswax: A Journal by Junie B. (and me!), and Junie B.'s These Puzzles Hurt My Brain! Book. Several box sets, multiple book bind-ups, and a Valentine's Day card collection have also been released. The series has been translated into Spanish, Italian and French.

Reception
The Junie B. Jones series came in at #71 on the American Library Association's list of the Top 100 Banned or Challenged Books from 2000 to 2009. Reasons cited are "poor social values taught by the books, and Junie B. Jones not being considered a good role model due to her mouthiness, bad spelling, and grammar."

While Barbara Park appreciated being on banned lists with writers she respected (including Maya Angelou and Toni Morrison), she stopped reading information about her books because the comments were "too hurtful." She once wrote "Some people believe that the value of a children's book can be measured only in terms of the moral lessons it tries to impose or the perfect role models it offers. Personally, I happen to think that a book is of extraordinary value if it gives the reader nothing more than a smile or two. In fact, I happen to think that's huge."

Adaptations

Theatrical plays

 Junie B. Jones the Musical, theatrical adaptation by Marcy Heisler and Zina Goldrich, Theatreworks USA
 Junie B. Jones the Musical JR, adaptation of Junie B. Jones the Musical intended to be performed by young actors
 Junie B. Jones and a Little Monkey Business, theatrical adaptation by Joan Cushing
 Junie B. Jones and the Stupid Smelly Bus Tour, Random House, tour by Momentum Worldwide
 2008 Tour - Caitlin Thurnauer as Junie B. Jones, Jay Paranada as Mr. Woo; tour managed by Michael Barth
 Junie B. Jones: Jingle Bells, Batman Smells, theatrical adaptation by Allison Gregory; music composed by Rob Witmer
 Junie B. Jones: First Grader: Shipwrecked, theatrical adaptation by Allison Gregory
 Junie B. Jones and a Little Monkey Business, theatrical adaptation performed at B Street Theatre

Video games
 Junie B. Jones Top-Secret Personal Beeswax educational video game for the LeapFrog Leapster learning system

Film

When asked about the topic of a feature-length film adaptation based on the books, Barbara Park stated in an interview that "Junie B. has been pretty successful already living in the readers' imaginations, so I am happy with that."

Television
On June 14, 2022, it was announced that Nickelodeon is developing an adaptation of the books.

References

External links 
 Junie B. Jones - Random House website
 Author Barbara Park - Random House website

Literary characters introduced in 1992
Characters in American novels of the 20th century
Characters in American novels of the 21st century
Series of children's books
Slapstick comedy
First-person narrative novels
Female characters in literature